Kunusara is a monotypic moth genus in the subfamily Lymantriinae described by Nye in 1980. Its only species, Kunusara fontainei, was first described by Cyril Leslie Collenette in 1960. It is found in the Congo Basin.

References

Lymantriini
Monotypic moth genera
Taxa named by Jacob Hübner
Moths of Africa